Meniscus is a Gram-negative, heterotrophic and aerotolerant genus of bacteria from the family of Prolixibacteraceae with one known species (Meniscus glaucopis).

References

Bacteroidia
Bacteria genera
Monotypic bacteria genera
Taxa described in 1977